Vladimir Simunović (born 30 September 1993) is a Serbian footballer who plays as a defender for FK Feniks 1995.

Club career
Simunović started training football with Palilulac Beograd at the age of 5. Later he moved to Zemun, where he spent a full decade playing in youth categories. He made his first senior appearances with the club in the 2010–11 Serbian First League season. He noted his first senior goals in a match against Radnički Kragujevac on 21 August 2010, when he scored a twice. Next he was a member of football club Kolubara for a period between 2011 and 2013, before he returned to Zemun for the second spell with club in 2014. He also spent the 2014–15 season playing with Turbina Vreoci in the Serbian League Belgrade. Later, he joined BSK Borča for the rest of 2015. At the beginning of next year, he moved to Inđija. Playing for the club, Simunović was the most standard player in squad, making 30 appearances in all competitions with 2 goals at total for the 2016–17 season. In summer 2017, Simunović signed a three-year contract with Radnički Niš. In summer 2018, Simunović sued the club over unpaid wages after which he terminated the contract at the expense of the club and left as a free agent. On the last day of the summer transfer window, Simunović signed with Spartak Subotica.

International career
Simunović was a member of Serbian U17 national team between 2009 and 2010, making 14 appearances with 2 goals. He had also been called into the under-18 level under coach Aleksandar Stanojević for the tournament at Tel Aviv.

Career statistics

Club

References

External links
 
 

1993 births
Living people
Footballers from Belgrade
Association football defenders
Serbian footballers
FK Zemun players
FK Kolubara players
FK BSK Borča players
FK Inđija players
FK Radnički Niš players
FK Spartak Subotica players
Serbian First League players
Serbian SuperLiga players